"What's Your Name" is a rock song by Lynyrd Skynyrd, the opening track on their album Street Survivors. It peaked at No. 13 on the U.S. Billboard Hot 100 and No. 6 in Canada.

Background
Lynyrd Skynyrd lead vocalist Ronnie Van Zant and guitarist Gary Rossington wrote "What's Your Name" while in Miami with producer Tom Dowd and Booker T. & the M.G.'s guitarist Steve Cropper. The lyrics depict a true story of the band drinking at their hotel bar during a tour when one of their roadies got into a fight. The band got kicked out of the bar, but they went into another room and ordered champagne. However, unlike the song suggests, the incident did not happen in the city of Boise, Idaho. Instead, when Van Zant found out that the band 38 Special (led by his younger brother Donnie) was starting its first national tour in that city, the lyric was changed.

Reception
Billboard praised the "strong, accessible melody" and the "excellent instrumentation."  Cash Box said that it "tells the standard 'rock and rollers on the road' story with a punchy lyric and a rousing beat." Record World said that "it rocks with authority, powered by a driving brass section and Van Zant's ironic vocal work."

Music video
The music video, released after the plane crash that killed several band members, depicts Ronnie's brother Johnny along with a newly reformed Lynyrd Skynyrd live in concert (presumably at the Pensacola Civic Center as the video suggests). Interspersed within are shots of the road crew setting up for the show and the musicians tuning their instruments, having makeup done, meeting with fans, autographing albums and playing baseball together. At the end of the video, a hat in the style of Ronnie's trademark "High Roller" look is seen atop a microphone stand as a tribute to him.

Chart performance

Year-end charts

Rock Band music gaming platform
The song was made available to download on November 30, 2010 for use in the Rock Band 3 music gaming platform in both Basic and Pro mode, the latter of which takes advantage of the use of a real guitar or bass guitar and MIDI-compatible electronic drum kits and keyboards in addition to three-part harmony vocals.

References

External links
 

1977 singles
Lynyrd Skynyrd songs
Song recordings produced by Tom Dowd
Songs written by Ronnie Van Zant
Songs written by Gary Rossington
1977 songs
MCA Records singles